Győr is a district in eastern part of Győr-Moson-Sopron County. Győr is also the name of the town where the district seat is found. The district is located in the Western Transdanubia Statistical Region.

Geography 
Győr District borders with Mosonmagyaróvár District, the Slovakian regions of Nitra Region and Trnava Region to the north, Komárom District and Kisbér District (Komárom-Esztergom County) to the east, Pannonhalma District and Pápa District (Veszprém County) to the south, Tét District and Csorna District to the west. The number of the inhabited places in Győr District is 35.

Municipalities 
The district has 1 urban county and 34 villages.
(ordered by population, as of 1 January 2012)

The bolded municipality is the city.

Demographics

In 2011, it had a population of 190,146 and the population density was 210/km².

Ethnicity
Besides the Hungarian majority, the main minorities are the German (approx. 2,800), Roma (1,300), Romanian (350), Slovak (300), Croat (200), Russian (150), Bulgarian and Polish (100).

Total population (2011 census): 190,146
Ethnic groups (2011 census): Identified themselves: 169,786 persons:
Hungarians: 162,698 (95.82%)
Germans: 2,825 (1.66%)
Others and indefinable: 4,263 (2.51%)
Approx. 20,000 persons in Győr District did not declare their ethnic group at the 2011 census.

Religion
Religious adherence in the county according to 2011 census:

Catholic – 92,924 (Roman Catholic – 92,361; Greek Catholic – 525);
Evangelical – 8,349; 
Reformed – 7,844;
other religions – 2,000; 
Non-religious – 21,134; 
Atheism – 2,391;
Undeclared – 55,504.

See also
List of cities and towns in Hungary

References

External links
 Postal codes of the Győr District

Districts in Győr-Moson-Sopron County